The men's 4 × 100 metre medley relay event at the 2016 Summer Olympics in Rio de Janeiro took place on 12–13 August at the Olympic Aquatics Stadium.

Summary
In his final race before retirement, Michael Phelps led the U.S. men's team to a record-breaking triumph in the medley relay at the Games, finishing an illustrious career as the most decorated Olympian of all-time with his twenty-third gold medal and twenty-eighth overall. The American foursome of Ryan Murphy (51.85), Cody Miller (59.03), Phelps (50.33), and Nathan Adrian (46.74) put together a historic ending with a gold-medal time and a new Olympic record of 3:27.95, shaving 1.39 seconds off the previous mark from Beijing 2008 on a since-banned, high-tech bodysuit. Moreover, Murphy erased the 2009 world backstroke record (51.94) from Aaron Peirsol by nine hundredths of a second on the lead-off leg.

Breaststroke world-record holder Adam Peaty threw down the fastest breaststroke split ever in 56.59 to deliver the British team of Chris Walker-Hebborn (53.68), James Guy (51.35), and Duncan Scott (47.62) a brief lead on the second leg, before the Americans edged them out to the front at the remaining laps of the race, leaving Great Britain with a silver medal and a national record in 3:29.24. Meanwhile, Kyle Chalmers produced a sterling freestyle anchor of 46.72 to give the Australian foursome of Mitch Larkin (53.19), Jake Packard (58.84), and David Morgan (51.18) the country's bronze-medal repeat from London 2012 with a final time of 3:29.93.

Outside the podium and the 3:30 club, the Russian quartet of Evgeny Rylov (52.90), Anton Chupkov (59.10), Aleksandr Sadovnikov (52.08), and Vladimir Morozov (47.22) picked up the fourth spot in 3:31.30, with Japan's Ryosuke Irie (53.46), Yasuhiro Koseki (58.65), Takuro Fujii (51.56), and Katsumi Nakamura (48.30) following them by 67-hundredths of a second to finish fifth in 3:31.97. Brazil's Guilherme Guido (54.23), João Gomes Júnior (58.59), Henrique Martins (51.52), and Marcelo Chierighini (48.50) enjoyed racing in front of the home crowd to take the sixth spot with a 3:32.84, while Germany (3:33.50), highlighted by breaststroker and 2015 world champion Marco Koch, rounded out the championship field. China was disqualified from the race, because of an early relay takeover by butterfly swimmer Li Zhuhao.

The medals for the competition were presented by Kirsty Coventry, IOC member, Zimbabwe, and the gifts were presented by Vladimir Salnikov, bureau member of the FINA.

Records
Prior to this competition, the existing world and Olympic records were as follows:

The following records were established during the competition:

BK – Backstroke lead-off leg

Competition format

The competition consisted of two rounds: heats and a final. The relay teams with the best 8 times in the heats advanced to the final. Swim-offs were used as necessary to break ties for advancement to the next round.

Results

Heats
A total of sixteen countries qualified to participate. The best eight from two heats advanced to the final.

Final

References

Men's 4 x 100 metre medley relay
4 × 100 metre medley relay
Men's events at the 2016 Summer Olympics